The 2018–19 Santosh Trophy was the 73rd edition of the Santosh Trophy, the premier competition in India for teams representing their regional and state football associations.

Kerala were the defending champions, having defeated West Bengal in the final during the 2017–18 season, but both teams failed to qualify for the main round.

Qualifiers

Following Ten teams have qualified :

 Assam 
 Delhi 
 Goa 
 Karnataka
 Maharashtra 
 Meghalaya 
 Odisha
 Punjab 
 Services 
 Sikkim

Group stage

Group A

Group B

Knockout stage

Bracket

Semi-finals

Final

Goalscorers

6 goals
 Ayush Adhikari (Delhi)
 Arif Shaikh (Maharashtra)

5 goals 
 Lallawkima PC (Services)

3 goals
 Bishnu Bordoloi (Assam) 
 M Nikhil Raj (Karnataka)

2 goals
 Raikut Shisha Buam (Meghalaya) 
 Milan Basumatary (Assam) 
 Lalawmpuia Ralte (Goa) 
 Chaitan Komarpant (Goa)
 Suresh Meitei (Services)
 Gunashekar Vignesh (Karnataka)
 Mahesh Selva (Karnataka)  
 Naorem Roshan Singh (Karnataka) 
 Chandra Muduli (Odisha)
 Sukhpreet Singh (Punjab)
 Vikrant Singh (Punjab) 
 Bikash Thapa (Services) 

1 Goal
 Glan Martins (Goa) 
 Stendly Fernandes (Goa)
 Jessel Carneiro (Goa) 
 Sarineo Fernandes (Goa)
 Victorino Fernandes (Goa) 
 Ronaldo Oliveira (Goa) 
 Prasanta Srihari (Odisha)
 Arvin Lakra (Odisha) 
 Enestar Malngiang (Meghalaya)
 Donborlang Nongkynrih (Meghalaya) 
 Manvir Singh (Karnataka) 
 Namgyal Bhutia (Karnataka) 
 Biswa Kr Darjee (Karnataka) 
 Johan Peter (Karnataka) 
 Rohan Shukla (Maharashtra) 
 Sanket Salokhe (Maharashtra) 
 Aman Gaikwad (Maharashtra) 
 Vinodkumar Chandrakishor Pandey (Maharashtra) 
 Lenader Dharmai (Maharashtra) 
 Rajbir Singh (Punjab)
 Taranjit Singh (Punjab) 
 Amandeep Singh (Punjab) 
 Jaspreet Singh (Punjab) 
 Harjinder Singh (Punjab)
 Harikrishna (Services) 
 Sabir Khan (Services) 
 Sushil Shah (Services) 
 Bikash Thapa (Services) 
 Akrang Narzary (Assam)
 Sirandeep Moran (Assam) 
 Sonam Zangpo Bhutia (Sikkim)

References

External links
 Santosh Trophy on the All India Football Federation website .

 
Santosh Trophy seasons